Vocabulary is the debut album of British new wave group Europeans. It was released on LP in September 1983; no CD version is available yet.

Track listing
All tracks written by Dugmore/Harper/Hogarth/Woore.

SIDE A
"The Animal Song" – 3:50
"A.E.I.O.U." – 4:00
"Voice on the Telephone" – 3:40
"American People" – 3:11
"Falling" – 5:20

SIDE B
"Recognition" – 3:34
"Innocence" – 4:03
"Spirit of Youth" – 3:33
"Modern Homes" – 3:22
"Kingdom Come" – 5:54

Personnel
Colin Woore - guitar, backing vocals
Steve Hogarth - synthesizer, vocals
Ferg Harper - bass guitar, lead vocals
Geoff Dugmore - drums, percussion, backing vocals
Carol Kenyon - vocals
Sylvia Butt - vocals
Kiki Dee - vocals
Toni Childs - vocals
Gary Barnacle - horns
Luke Tunney - horns
Pete Toms - horns

External links
Excerpts from reviews of the album (accessed 2020-03-09)

1983 debut albums
The Europeans (band) albums
A&M Records albums